The 1948 Southwest Texas State Bobcats football team was an American football team that represented Southwest Texas State Teachers College (now known as Texas State University) during the 1948 college football season as a member of the Lone Star Conference (LSC). In their third year under head coach George Vest, the team compiled an overall record of 8–1 with a mark of 6–0 in conference play, and finished as Lone Star champion.

Schedule

References

Southwest Texas State
Texas State Bobcats football seasons
Lone Star Conference football champion seasons
Southwest Texas State Bobcats football